The Monastery of Nuestra Señora del Prado (Spanish: Monasterio de Nuestra Señora del Prado) is a monastery located in Valladolid, Spain. It was declared Bien de Interés Cultural in 1877.

References

See also 

 List of Bien de Interés Cultural in the Province of Valladolid

Bien de Interés Cultural landmarks in the Province of Valladolid
Monasteries in Castile and León
Baroque architecture in Castile and León
Renaissance architecture in Castile and León